Winnie Matsiko is a female Ugandan politician and National Resistance Movement candidate for Rukungiri Woman Member of Parliament by-election in the 10th Parliament of Uganda.

A total of six candidates who were nominated for the by-election included; FDC's Betty Muzanira, NRM's Winifred Matsiko, Fabith Kukundakwe of People's Progressive Party's and independent candidates Sheila Atukunda Kirebete, Seith Mbaguta and Elizabeth Rwakitonera. In 2018, the Court of Appeal threw out Winnie Matsiko out of parliament after a successful challenge by FDC's Betty Muzanira. The  court found that Matsiko bribed voters by contributing money to different churches during campaigns. The court also faulted the Electoral Commission for failure to adhere to electoral laws relating to tallying of results before it declared Matsiko winner.

See also 

 List of members of the tenth Parliament of Uganda
 Rukungiri
 National Resistance Movement
 Member of Parliament
 Parliament of Uganda

External links 

 Website of the Parliament of Uganda
 Winnie Matsiko on Facebook

References 

Living people
Year of birth missing (living people)
People from Rukungiri District
National Resistance Movement politicians
Women members of the Parliament of Uganda
Members of the Parliament of Uganda